Barbara Haas (born 19 March 1996) is an Austrian tennis player.

Playing career
She has won 16 singles titles and two doubles titles on the ITF Circuit. On 24 February 2020, she reached her best singles ranking by the WTA of 133. On 27 September 2021, she peaked at No. 164 in the doubles rankings.

Haas made her WTA Tour debut at the 2012 Gastein Ladies and also played at the 2012 Linz Open.

Playing for Austria Fed Cup team, Haas has a win–loss record of 16–8 in Fed Cup competition, as of September 2022.

Grand Slam singles performance timelines

WTA career finals

Doubles: 2 (2 runner-ups)

ITF Circuit finals

Singles: 28 (16 titles, 12 runner–ups)

Doubles: 6 (3 titles, 3 runner–ups)

Notes

References

External links

 
 
 
 
 

1996 births
Living people
Austrian female tennis players
Sportspeople from Upper Austria
People from Steyr
20th-century Austrian women
21st-century Austrian women